EPS, EPs or Eps may refer to:

Commerce and finance 
 Earnings per share
 Electronic Payment Services, in Hong Kong, Macau, and Shenzhen, China
 Express Payment System, in the Philippines

Education 
 Española Public Schools, New Mexico, US

Law and military
 Edmonton Police Service, Canada
 Sandinista Popular Army, in Nigaragua
 European Protected Species

Music 
 Eps (album), a 1999 album by Robert Wyatt
 The EPs (Lacuna Coil album), 2005
 The EPs (Apoptygma Berzerk), EPs recorded by Apoptygma Berzerk
 Ensoniq EPS, a sampler
 George Van Eps (1913-1998), American jazz guitarist

Science and medicine
 Extracellular polymeric substance
 Extrapyramidal symptoms
 European Physical Society
 Experimental Psychology Society
 Encapsulating Peritoneal Sclerosis
 Ensemble Prediction System, used in ensemble forecasting
 Equal probability of selection in statistical sampling methods
 Expressed prostatic secretion, collected by prostate massage

Technology
 Eco pickled surface, a process applied to hot rolled sheet steel
 Electric power steering
 Electromagnetic Parking Sensor
 Elizabeth's Percentage System, a mathematical formula for sizing garments
 EUMETSAT Polar System, a satellite system
 Expanded polystyrene
 External power supply

Computing
 Encapsulated PostScript, a graphics file format
 Entry-Level Power Supply Specification, a computer power supply
 Evolved Packet System, a telecommunications system 
 Machine epsilon

Other uses 
 Abbreviaiton of episodes, e.g. in TV or radio
 Eps, Pas-de-Calais, France
 Economists for Peace and Security, US organization
 Edappadi K. Palaniswami, Indian politician
 Elektroprivreda Srbije, the electric power utility of Serbia
 European Passenger Services, a former division of British Rail
 European Political Science, a journal
 Evangelical Philosophical Society